The 2002 UCI Track Cycling World Cup Classics is a multi race tournament over a season of track cycling. The season ran from 19 April 2002 to 11 August 2002. The World Cup is organised by the UCI.

Results

Men

Women

References

Overall results (Archived 2009-05-14)
Round 1, Monterrey Results
Round 2, Sydney Results
Round 3, Moscow Results
Round 4, Cali Results
Round 5, Kunming Results

World Cup Classics
UCI Track Cycling World Cup